Wonder World is the second Korean-language studio album by South Korean girl group Wonder Girls, released on November 7, 2011, through JYP Entertainment. The track "Be My Baby" served as the lead single from album. Both the album and the single was a commercial success, both having topped the Gaon Album and Digital charts respectively. To promote Wonder World, the group appeared on several South Korean music programs; additionally, Wonder Girls embarked on their Wonder World Tour in July 2012.

The album marked the point where the members were more involved in the songwriting in production: Park Ye-eun wrote and produced "G.N.O." and "Me, In", Kim Yubin wrote "Girls Girls", "Me, In" and "Sweet Dreams" while Woo Hyelim wrote and produced her solo song "Act Cool", featuring San E. The members also recorded two duets: Min Sunye and Yeeun recorded "Long Long Time" while Yubin and Ahn Sohee recorded "SuperB".

Background and composition
On November 4, the album's name was revealed to be Wonder World, consisting of 11 new songs, one remixed song, and an English version of the lead single, "Be My Baby". Various members of the group contributed to composing material for the album. Park Ye-eun was the composer and lyricist for the song "G.N.O." and performed the arrangement and composition for "Me, In", a remake of the 1974 hit "The Beauty" by Shin Jung-hyeon and YeopJeons. In an interview she commented about the strong American influence that she had received while working on new music in the album as she stated "When I went to a club, I heard songs from Rihanna and LMFAO. We thought it would be nice if we could make club music, done right, in Korean."

Woo Hyelim collaborated with rapper San-E for her solo song "Act Cool" for which also helped her write the rap lyrics. Kim Yubin wrote the raps for the songs "Girls Girls" "Me, In" and "Sweet Dreams". Ahn Sohee and Yubin recorded a duet together called "SuperB", and Yeeun and Min Sunye also had a duet titled "두고두고" (Long Long Time). Renowned choreographer Jonte' Moaning, who worked with American R&B artist Beyoncé on her song "Freakum Dress" and has served as a back-up dancer for "Single Ladies", helped choreograph the group's music video for "Be My Baby". Designer Johnny Wujek, who was also the fashion stylist for American pop artist Katy Perry's "I Kissed a Girl" and "California Gurls", also worked alongside the group.

Commercial performance
Wonder World entered and peaked at number one on the Gaon Album Chart on the chart issue dated November 6–12, 2011. The album stayed in the Top 10 of the chart for four consecutive weeks. The album entered and peaked at number 4 on the chart for the month of November 2011 with 35,051 physical copies sold. The album placed at number 42 on the Gaon Album Chart for the year 2011 for 34,140 physical copies sold. In the United States, the album entered and peaked at number 5 on Billboard's World Albums chart on the week ending November 26, 2011. "Be My Baby" went to number 1 on both the Gaon Weekly Digital Charts and the Billboard K-pop Hot 100. The song was also featured on the group's TV movie, Wonder Girls at the Apollo, which aired on TeenNick.

Accolades

Track listing

Sample credits
"Me, In" contains a sample of Shin Jung-hyeon's song "The Beauty".

Credits and personnel

Sunye – vocals (all tracks except 9, 10)
Yeeun – vocals (all tracks except 9, 10), songwriting, production (tracks 1, 4), rearrangement (track 4)
Yubin – rapping (all tracks except 8, 10), songwriting (tracks 3, 4, 5)
Sohee – vocals (all tracks except for tracks 8, 10)
Hyelim – vocals, rapping (all tracks except 8, 9), songwriting, production (track 10)
Lee Woo-min – producer (track 1), rearrangement (track 4)
Fredrik – producer (track 1)
Cho Jong-soo – raps (track 1)
Park Jin-young – songwriting, production (tracks 2, 8, 11)
Shim Eun-ji – songwriting (track 3), production (tracks 3, 5)
Shin Jung-hyeon – songwriting, production (track 4)
Billion Dollar Baby – songwriting (track 5)
Noday - songwriting (track 5)

DeepFrost - production (track 5)
Hong Ji-sang – songwriting, production (track 6)
Jessica Martinez – songwriting (track 7)
Nikki Flores – songwriting (track 7)
Fingazz – production (track 7)
DJ Nüre – production (track 7)
Kim Eana – songwriting (track 8)
East4A – production (track 8)
San E – featured artist, rapping, songwriting, production (track 10)
Woo Seok Rhee – songwriting, production (track 12)
Alexander Kronlund – songwriting, production (track 12)
Lukas Hilbert – songwriting, production (track 12)

Charts

Weekly charts

Monthly charts

Year-end charts

Sales

Release history

References

Wonder Girls albums
2011 albums
Dance-pop albums by South Korean artists
Korean-language albums
JYP Entertainment albums
Kakao M albums